Torreón is a city in the Mexican state of Coahuila. Torreon or Torreón may also refer to:

Torreón Municipality, Coahuila, Mexico
Roman Catholic Diocese of Torreón, Coahuila, Mexico
Torreón massacre, a racially motivated massacre in 1911 in Torreón, Coahuila, Mexico
Torreon, Sandoval County, New Mexico, USA, a rural census-designated place (CDP)
Torreon, Torrance County, New Mexico, USA, a farming community and CDP
Torreón de la Chorrera, a fortification in Havana, Cuba
Torreón de Llanes, a medieval tower in Llanes, Asturias, Spain
Torreón Airport, near Coelemu, Bío Bío, Chile